The Men's 100 metre freestyle S8 event at the 2010 Commonwealth Games took place on 8 October 2010, at the SPM Swimming Pool Complex, Delhi.

Finals

References

Aquatics at the 2010 Commonwealth Games